The 1919 Saxony state election was held on 2 February 1919 to elect the 97 members of the Saxony People's Chamber.

Results

References 

Saxony
Elections in Saxony
February 1919 events